Zha Shenxing (7 June 1650 – 25 September 1727) was a Chinese poet in the early Qing dynasty.

Biography
Zha was born Zha Silian in 1650 in Haining, Zhejiang. He had two younger brothers, Zha Sixun and Zha Siting. In his early years, he studied Confucian Classics under Confucianist Huang Zongxi. At the age of 19, he became a student of Ye Boyin. At the age of 20, he began traveling around the country. In 1689, he was dismissed and sent home for involvement in the case of Hong Sheng. In 1703, he sat for the imperial examination and obtained the position of a Jinshi. He was assigned to the Hanlin Academy and the Southern Study. In 1727, his brother Zha Siting committed a literary inquisition, he was also arrested. Yongzheng Emperor knew that he was prudent and righteous, and intentionally let him return to his hometown. He died in the following year.

References

Further reading

1650 births
People from Haining
1727 deaths
Writers from Jiaxing
18th-century Chinese writers
17th-century Chinese writers
Qing dynasty poets